Inherit is the third studio album by the American band Free Kitten, released on May 20, 2008. It was their first album in over ten years, the last being 1997's Sentimental Education. Dinosaur Jr.'s J Mascis appears on two songs on this album, "Surf's Up", and "Bananas".

Track listing
"Erected Girl" – 6:45
"Surf's Up" – 3:39
"Seasick" – 3:24
"Free Kitten on the Mountain" – 7:51
"Roughshod" – 1:28
"Help Me" – 1:45
"The Poet" – 3:41
"Billboard" – 2:37
"Bananas" – 2:49
"Monster Eye" – 11:32
"Sway" – 3:51

Personnel
Free Kitten
Kim Gordon – vocals, guitar
Julie Cafritz – vocals, guitar
Yoshimi P-We – drums, guitar on "Sway"
J Mascis – additional guitar on "Surf's Up", drums on "Bananas"
Justin Pizzoferrato – producer, mixer, recorder
John Golden – mastering at Golden Mastering

References

2008 albums
Ecstatic Peace! albums
Free Kitten albums